The 2022 LFA season was the seventh season of operation (sixth season of play) of the Liga de Fútbol Americano Profesional (LFA), the top American football league in Mexico. The regular season began on 4 March and concluded on 24 April, with the playoffs beginning on April 30 and ending with the Tazón México V, on 21 May. The league returned after a two-season hiatus.

Fundidores won their first LFA championship after defeating Gallos Negros 18–14 in the Tazón México V, played in Tijuana.

Preseason events

Expansion
Two new teams joined the league for the 2022 season: Galgos de Tijuana, based in Tijuana, and Reyes de Jalisco, based in Zapopan, Jalisco. The league also lost one team, Osos de Toluca, that folded in January 2021. With these changes, the 2022 season will be contested by seven teams and, unlike the previous seasons, the league will not be divided into two divisions. As a result, the league decided to expand the playoff field from four teams to six teams. The top two teams will have a bye in the quarterfinals and will host home field in the semifinals.

Condors originally relocated to Querétaro City, and changed its name to Condors de Querétaro, after their acquisition to the ownership group that owned Querétaro F.C. On 3 February 2022, the team officially were rebranded as Gallos Negros de Querétaro. Following the rebrand, the league considers Gallos Negros as a new franchise that began competing in the 2022 season.

Stadium changes
Dinos moved to the Estadio Francisco I. Madero after an agreement with the owners of the stadium, the baseball club Saraperos de Saltillo of the Mexican League.
Mexicas moved from the Estadio Perros Negros to the Estadio Jesús Martínez "Palillo".
Raptors returned to play their home games in the Estadio FES Acatlán, after playing in the Estadio José Ortega Martínez for the previous two seasons.

Draft

Teams

Regular season

Standings
Note: GP = Games played, W = Wins, L = Losses, PF = Points For, PA = Points against

Schedule

Results

Regular-season statistical leaders

Playoffs

Playoff bracket

Results

Tazón México V

The Tazón México V was held on 21 May 2022 at 7:00 p.m. PST at the Estadio Caliente in Tijuana. Fundidores became LFA champions, after beating Gallos Negros by a score of 14–18.

Awards 
On 22 February 2023, the league announced the winners of the 2022 season awards.

Notes

References

LFA
LFA
LFA seasons